The archeological site of Bura is located in the Tillabéry Region, of the Tera Department, in southwest Niger.  The Bura archeological site has given its name to the area's first-millennium Bura culture.

Site description 
The Bura site consists of many individual necropoleis with coffins crested by unusually-distinctive terra cotta statuettes.  The main necropolis itself has a diameter of about one kilometer.  Burial mounds, religious altars, and ancient dwellings occur here over a large area.  In 1983 a site 25 meters by 20 meters was excavated.

Artifacts and looting 
Following the 1975 discovery and 1983 excavation of the Bura archeological site, and after a Bura-Asinda exhibition toured France in the 1990s, the ancient Bura earthenware statuettes became highly valued by collectors.

The clay and stone anthropomorphic heads of the ancient and medieval Bura culture have been sought for their unusual abstraction and simplicity.

Unfortunately, widespread looting and smuggling has followed this commercial demand, and so many of the Bura culture sites have been negatively impacted.  Le Monde concludes that "90 percent of Niger's Bura sites have been damaged" by looters and vandals since 1994. 

Other Bura artifacts have been large terracotta burial jars (both tubular and ovoid) and varied funerary pottery.  Of the 834 Bura-related sites in the Niger River valley, UNESCO reports that the original Bura archeological site has produced the oldest equestrian clay statues.  

More recently, many Bura "rat-tail" iron-age spear-points have also entered the Euro-American collectors market.

World Heritage status 
This site was added to the UNESCO World Heritage Tentative List on May 26, 2006 in the Cultural category.

References 

History of Niger
Tillabéri Region
Prehistoric Africa
Countries in ancient Africa
Countries in medieval Africa
Archaeological sites in Niger
World Heritage Tentative List for Niger
2006 in Niger
Archaeological sites of Western Africa